Burnaby South is a federal electoral district in British Columbia. It encompasses a portion of British Columbia previously included in the electoral districts of Burnaby—Douglas and Burnaby—New Westminster.

Burnaby South was created by the 2012 federal electoral boundaries redistribution and was legally defined in the 2013 representation order. It came into effect upon the call of the 42nd Canadian federal election, which took place in October 2015.

There was a by-election on February 25, 2019, to determine the Member of Parliament for Burnaby South, which was won by New Democratic Party leader Jagmeet Singh. The seat was vacated by Kennedy Stewart, who resigned in September 2018 and won the 2018 Vancouver municipal election in October to become the mayor of Vancouver.

Geography
As of the 2012 federal electoral boundaries redistribution, the district includes the southwestern portion of the City of Burnaby and the eastern portion of the city between the Trans-Canada Highway and Highway 7. More specifically...

Demographics

Members of Parliament
This riding has elected the following members of the House of Commons of Canada:

Election results

Notes

References

British Columbia federal electoral districts
Federal electoral districts in Greater Vancouver and the Fraser Valley
Politics of Burnaby